Colby Wadman (born April 19, 1995) is an American football punter for the Birmingham Stallions of the United States Football League (USFL). He played college football at University of California, Davis.

Early years
Wadman attended and played high school football at Thousand Oaks High School.

College career
Wadman attended and played college football at UC Davis.

Collegiate statistics

Professional career

Oakland Raiders
On March 16, 2018, Wadman signed with the Oakland Raiders. He was waived on May 11, 2018.

Denver Broncos
On September 26, 2018, Wadman was signed to the Denver Broncos' practice squad. He was promoted to the active roster on October 6, 2018, following an injury to Marquette King. In Week 5 of the 2018 season, he made his NFL debut and had eight punts for 329 net yards in the loss to the New York Jets. Overall, in the 2018 season, he finished with 65 punts for 2,905 net yards for a 44.69 average.

On April 23, 2020, Wadman was waived by the Broncos.

San Francisco 49ers
On December 29, 2021, Wadman was signed to the San Francisco 49ers practice squad. He was released on January 3, 2022.

Birmingham Stallions
Wadman was selected in the 33rd round of the 2022 USFL Draft by the Birmingham Stallions.

References

External links
 Denver Broncos bio
 UC Davis Aggies bio

1995 births
Living people
American football punters
UC Davis Aggies football players
Oakland Raiders players
Denver Broncos players
San Francisco 49ers players
Birmingham Stallions (2022) players
Players of American football from Maine
Sportspeople from Bangor, Maine